James Sweeney (September 24, 1845 – June 26, 1931) was a Union Army soldier during the American Civil War. He received the Medal of Honor for gallantry during the Battle of Cedar Creek fought near Middletown, Virginia on October 19, 1864. The battle was the decisive engagement of Major General Philip Sheridan's Valley Campaigns of 1864 and was the largest battle fought in the Shenandoah Valley.

Medal of Honor citation
"The President of the United States of America, in the name of Congress, takes pleasure in presenting the Medal of Honor to Private James Sweeney, United States Army, for extraordinary heroism on 19 October 1864, while serving with Company A, 1st Vermont Cavalry, in action at Cedar Creek, Virginia. With one companion Private Sweeney captured the State flag of a North Carolina regiment, together with three officers and an ambulance with its mules and driver."

The companion mentioned in his citation was corporal Frederick A. Lyon, who also received the Medal of Honor. One of the captured officers was the mortally wounded general Stephen Dodson Ramseur, who died the next day.

Sweeney was sent to Washington, D.C. with the captured Confederate flag. He was personally introduced to Secretary of War Edwin M. Stanton by General George Custer. Stanton personally presented the Medal of Honor to Sweeney who was also promoted to corporal.

See also

List of Medal of Honor recipients
List of American Civil War Medal of Honor recipients: Q-S

References

External links
Military Times Hall of Valor
Findagrave entry
Vermont in the Civil War

1845 births
1931 deaths
Military personnel from Manchester
British emigrants to the United States
People of Vermont in the American Civil War
People of California in the American Civil War
Union Army soldiers
United States Army Medal of Honor recipients
English-born Medal of Honor recipients
American Civil War recipients of the Medal of Honor
Burials at Los Angeles National Cemetery